Avikash Lal (born 18 June 1995 in Nadi) is a Fijian long-distance runner. He competed in the 2019 Pacific Games in Apia, winning the Gold in half-marathon, and the silver medal on 5000 m.

On the same distance, he also won the Bronze medal at 2015 Pacific Games.
He won the 10,000 m title at 2017 Oceania Athletics Championships in Suva.

References

1995 births
Living people
Fijian male long-distance runners
Fijian male marathon runners
Sportspeople from Nadi
20th-century Fijian people
21st-century Fijian people